Emma Louise Wilkins (born 1 February 1991) is a British sprint freestyle swimmer.

Wilkins represented Great Britain at the 2008 European Short Course Swimming Championships in the 50 m and 100 m freestyle and in the 4×50 m freestyle relay swimming events. She also competed at the 2009 World Aquatics Championships in Rome, swimming in the 50 m freestyle.

Emma was born in Stafford, Staffordshire and raised in Cannock where she attended Cardinal Griffin High School before being awarded a swimming scholarship at Plymouth College Independent School, where she moved at the age of 16 years in order to combine her education and sporting aspirations.

References

1991 births
Living people
English female swimmers
English female freestyle swimmers
People educated at Plymouth College
Sportspeople from Stafford
20th-century English women
21st-century English women